Stigmella zagulaevi is a moth of the family Nepticulidae. It is found in Russia (the northern Caucasus).

References

Moths described in 1994
Nepticulidae
Moths of Europe